Quillette is an online magazine founded by Australian journalist Claire Lehmann. The magazine primarily focuses on science, technology, news, culture, and politics. It also has a podcast, hosted by Jon Kay.

Quillette was created in 2015 to focus on scientific topics, but has come to focus on coverage of political and cultural issues concerning freedom of speech and identity politics. It has been described as libertarian-leaning.

History 
Quillette was founded in October 2015 in Sydney, Australia, by Claire Lehmann.

It is named after the French word "quillette" which means a withy cutting planted so that it takes root—used here as a metaphor for an essay. Lehmann stated that Quillette was created with the aim of "setting up a space where we could critique the blank slate orthodoxy" – a theory of human development which assumes individuals are largely products of nurture, not nature – but that it "naturally evolved into a place where people critique other aspects of what they see as left-wing orthodoxy".

In August 2017, Quillette published an article written by four academics in support of James Damore's "Google's Ideological Echo Chamber" memo. Quillette website was temporarily disabled. According to Lehmann, this was caused by a DDoS attack after publishing the piece.

In a profile of Quillette, Politico reported that Lehmann knew about the grievance studies affair before it was first reported in October 2018, and was part of planning how to "fan the flames" of that controversy with the magazine's subsequent story defending the hoax.

In May 2019, Quillette published an article that alleged connections between antifa activists and national-level reporters who cover the far-right based on the accounts these reporters followed on Twitter. Shane Burley and Alexander Reid Ross, who were mentioned in the article, said that they and other journalists received death threats after the claims were published.

In August 2019, Quillette published a hoax article titled "DSA Is Doomed" submitted by an anonymous writer claiming to be a construction worker named Archie Carter who was critical of the organisation Democratic Socialists of America. The magazine retracted the article after the hoax was brought to its attention. According to socialist magazine Jacobin, the hoax brought Quillette fact-checking and editorial standards into question.

Reception  
In an article for The Outline, writer Gaby Del Valle classifies Quillette as "libertarian-leaning", "academia-focused" and "a hub for reactionary thought." In the Seattle newspaper The Stranger, Katie Herzog writes that it has won praise "from both Steven Pinker and Richard Dawkins", adding that "most of the contributors are academics but the site reads more like a well researched opinion section than an academic journal". In an opinion piece for USA Today, columnist Cathy Young describes Quillette as "libertarian-leaning". An article in Vice described Quillette as a "libertarian magazine".

Politico and Vox reported that Quillette has been associated with the "intellectual dark web", a term used, according to Politico, to describe "a loose cadre of academics, journalists and tech entrepreneurs who view themselves as standing up to the knee-jerk left-leaning politics of academia and the media." Writing for The New York Times, Bari Weiss referred to Claire Lehmann as a figure in the "intellectual dark web".

Writing for The Guardian, Jason Wilson describes Quillette as "a website obsessed with the alleged war on free speech on campus". Writing for The Washington Post, Aaron Hanlon describes Quillette as a "magazine obsessed with the evils of 'critical theory' and postmodernism".

Writing for New York magazine's column The Daily Intelligencer Andrew Sullivan described Quillette as "refreshingly heterodox" in 2018.

Richard Dawkins praised Quillette for being a "suberb online magazine, stands up for the oppressed minority who value clarity, logic and objective truth."

Steven Pinker said "For those who feel that academia and journalism are losing their minds, Quillette has offered lungfuls of fresh air—reasoned, nondogmatic, and often common-sense analyses that have been banished from the mainstream outlets."

In a piece for Slate, Daniel Engber suggested that while some of its output was "excellent and interesting", the average Quillette story "is dogmatic, repetitious, and a bore". He wrote that it describes "even modest harms inflicted via groupthink—e.g., dropped theater projects, flagging book sales, condemnatory tweets—as 'serious adversity'", arguing that various authors in Quillette engage in the same victim mentality that they attempt to criticise. In an article for The Daily Beast, writer Alex Leo described Quillette as "a site that fancies itself intellectually contrarian but mostly publishes right-wing talking points couched in grievance politics".

Quillette has, controversially, published articles supporting the "Human Biodiversity Movement" (HBM). HBM refers to beliefs that human behaviors are impacted by inherited genes, and certain predispositions are unique to certain ethnic groups. Quillette published articles supporting Noah Carl. Quillette has been accused of promoting pseudoscience and eugenics. Contributors who have written about "human biodiversity" for Quillette include Ben Winegard, Bo Winegard, Brian Boutwell, and John Paul Wright.

References

External links 
 

2015 establishments in Australia
Australian news websites
Internet properties established in 2015
Libertarianism in Australia
Libertarian publications
Magazines established in 2015
Magazines published in Sydney
Online magazines